Daniel Whittle Harvey (10 January 1786 – 24 February 1863) was a Radical English politician who founded The Sunday Times newspaper and was the first Commissioner of the City of London Police.

Harvey trained as a lawyer, and became a Fellow of the Inner Temple in 1818, but was twice refused admission to the bar. He first stood for Parliament in 1812 as Radical candidate for Colchester, and was defeated, but secured election for the same borough in 1818. At the 1820 election he was deprived of victory when his qualification proved defective, but he was re-elected in 1826 and for several elections thereafter; he subsequently also represented Southwark. He was a gifted orator and consistently took a moderate radical line, advocating limited reform both of Parliament and of the Church, and was at times bitterly at odds with the Whig government. In 1839 he was one of the MPs who took part in the conference with William Lovett's London Working Men's Association from which the Chartists emerged.

In 1821, Harvey founded a Sunday newspaper, The New Observer, which the following year adopted its present title, The Sunday Times. On one occasion he was imprisoned when the paper libelled the King, George IV.

In 1839, he was appointed Registrar of the Metropolitan Public Carriages,  becoming the chief regulator of the taxi trade in London. Later the same year, the City of London Police was re-organised, and Harvey relinquished his seat in Parliament to become its first Commissioner; he retained the post until 1863.

References
 Concise Dictionary of National Biography
 F W S Craig, "British Parliamentary Election Results 1832-1885" (2nd edition, Aldershot: Parliamentary Research Services, 1989)
 Victoria County History of Essex, online at www.british-history.ac.uk

External links 
 
 

1786 births
1863 deaths
Members of the Parliament of the United Kingdom for English constituencies
UK MPs 1818–1820
UK MPs 1826–1830
UK MPs 1830–1831
UK MPs 1831–1832
UK MPs 1832–1835
UK MPs 1835–1837
UK MPs 1837–1841
Commissioners of the City of London Police